Ego Channel is an Israeli digital cable television channel that launched in 2002. Ego's programming is tailored to the "hot-blooded 18-45 male audience". Ego is owned by Ananey Communications, a subsidiary of ViacomCBS Networks EMEAA.

Programming occurs across four categories:
 Non-fiction action
 Finance
 Boys' toys
 Adult.

References

External links
 Official Site

Television channels in Israel
Television channels and stations established in 2002
2002 establishments in Israel
Men's interest channels
Paramount International Networks